The 1962–63 Serie A season was the 29th season of the Serie A, the top level of ice hockey in Italy. Five teams participated in the league, and HC Bolzano won the championship.

Regular season

External links
 Season on hockeytime.net

1962–63 in Italian ice hockey
Serie A (ice hockey) seasons
Italy